The Irish Whiskey Rebellion (also known as A Change in The Wind) is a 1972 crime drama, directed by Chester Erskine and starring William Devane, Anne Meara, Richard Mulligan, John Pleshette, David Groh, Stephen Joyce, and William Challee. It is based on a 1969 novel by Leslie Waller "A Change in The Wind." The film is set in Prohibition Era and shows a story of an IRA member who tries to land a shipment of contraband whiskey.

Plot 

The film is set in 1927 on Fire Island. IRA veteran Harry Regan (Stephen Joyce) arrives to the US and wants to arrange a shipment of contraband whiskey to support the struggle for independence. He is being chased by a brutal Coast Guard Lt. Commander Ashley (William Devane) and confronts local crime syndicate member Maxie (David Groh).

Production
The Irish Whiskey Rebellion was filmed in September—early November 1971 on Fire Island, New York, mostly in Saltaire, Long Cove and Skunk Hollow. It is believed that director Chester Erskine used the pseudonym of "J. C. Works" on the film's credit (as author). The film featured newsreel footage from the 1916-1921 period in Ireland and of events associated with Charles Lindbergh's Atlantic crossing.

Critical response
TV Guide gave the film 2 starts out five with the verdict “Devane's performance is up to his usual high standard, and the period atmosphere is believable; but that's still not enough to raise the film above mediocrity”.

References

External links 
 

1972 films
Cinerama Releasing Corporation films
Films directed by Chester Erskine
American crime drama films
1972 crime drama films
1970s English-language films
1970s American films